Margarella is a genus of sea snails, marine gastropod molluscs in the subfamily 	Margarellinae of the family Calliostomatidae.

Species
Species within the genus Margarella include:
 Margarella achilles (Strebel, 1908)
 Margarella antarctica (Lamy, 1905)
 Margarella bouvetia Powell, 1951
 Margarella crebrilirulata (E.A. Smith, 1907)
 Margarella expansa (Sowerby I, 1838)
 Margarella gunnerusensis Numanami, 1996
 Margarella jason A. W. B. Powell, 1951
 Margarella macquariensis Hedley, 1916
 Margarella obsoleta A. W. B. Powell, 1951
 Margarella porcellana A. W. B. Powell, 1951
 Margarella pruinosa (Rochebrune & Mabille, 1885)
 Margarella refulgens (E.A. Smith, 1907)
 † Margarella runcinata Marwick, 1928
 Margarella steineni (Strebel, 1905)
 Margarella subantarctica (Strebel, 1908)
 Margarella tropidophoroides (Strebel, 1908)
 Margarella violacea (King & Broderip, 1832)
 Margarella wacei (Melvill & Standen, 1918)
 Margarella whiteana Linse, 2002
Species brought into synonymy
 Margarella antipoda antipoda (Hombron & Jacquinot, 1854): synonym of Cantharidus antipoda (Hombron & Jacquinot, 1854)
 Margarella antipoda hinemoa Powell, 1955: synonym of Cantharidus antipoda hinemoa (Powell, 1955)
 Margarella antipoda puysegurensis Powell, 1939: synonym of Cantharidus antipoda puysegurensis (Powell, 1939)
 Margarella antipoda rosea (Hutton, 1873): synonym of Cantharidus rosea (Hutton, 1873) 
 Margarella fulminata (Hutton, 1873): synonym of Cantharidus fulminatus (Hutton, 1873)
 Margarella hinemoa Powell, 1955: synonym of Cantharidus antipodum (Hombron & Jacquinot, 1848)
 Margarella puysegurensis Powell, 1939: synonym of Cantharidus (Pseudomargarella) puysegurensis (Powell, 1939) represented as Cantharidus puysegurensis (Powell, 1939)
 Margarella turneri Powell, 1939: synonym of Cantharidus turneri (Powell, 1939)

References

 Spencer, H.; Marshall. B. (2009). All Mollusca except Opisthobranchia. In: Gordon, D. (Ed.) (2009). New Zealand Inventory of Biodiversity. Volume One: Kingdom Animalia. 584 pp

Further reading
 Powell A W B, New Zealand Mollusca, William Collins Publishers Ltd, Auckland, New Zealand 1979 
  Zelaya D.G. (2004) The genus Margarella Thiele, 1893 (Gastropoda: Trochidae) in the southwestern Atlantic Ocean. The Nautilus 118(3): 112–120.

External links
 NZ Mollusca

 
Calliostomatidae